In September 2005, Apocalypse was invited to the Rock Symphony for the Record Festival at the Teatro Municipal de Niterói, Rio de Janeiro, Brazil. The band's concert, on 8 September, was taped for posterity and released in DVD and CD format. In this project the Apocalypse band recorded some of their old hits in English language.

Track listing
 Cut 		
 South America 		
 Refuge 		
 Mirage 		
 Blue Earth 		
 Magic 		
 Waterfall Of Golden Waters 		
 Tears 		
 Time Traveller 		
 Coming From The Stars Medley 		
 Peace In The Loneliness

Musicians

 Eloy Fritsch: Electronic keyboards, Organ, Minimoog, vocals
 Ruy Fritsch: Electric and acoustic guitars, vocals
 Chico Fasoli: Drums, percussion, vocals
 Gustavo Demarchi: Lead Vocal, flute
 Magoo Wise: Bass guitar

References

2007 live albums
Apocalypse (band) albums